Keating Township is the name of some places in the U.S. state of Pennsylvania:

Keating Township, McKean County, Pennsylvania
Keating Township, Potter County, Pennsylvania

See also
 East Keating Township, Clinton County, Pennsylvania
 West Keating Township, Clinton County, Pennsylvania

Pennsylvania township disambiguation pages